

Events

Pre-1600
1215 – Zhongdu (now Beijing), then under the control of the Jurchen ruler Emperor Xuanzong of Jin, is captured by the Mongols under Genghis Khan, ending the Battle of Zhongdu.
1252 – Alfonso X is proclaimed king of Castile and León.
1298 – Residents of Riga and Grand Duchy of Lithuania defeated the Livonian Order in the Battle of Turaida.
1495 – A monk, John Cor, records the first known batch of Scotch whisky.
1533 – Anne Boleyn is crowned Queen of England.
1535 – Combined forces loyal to Charles V attack and expel the Ottomans from Tunis during the Conquest of Tunis.

1601–1900
1648 – The Roundheads defeat the Cavaliers at the Battle of Maidstone in the Second English Civil War.
1649 – Start of the Sumuroy Revolt: Filipinos in Northern Samar led by Agustin Sumuroy revolt against Spanish colonial authorities.
1670 – In Dover, England, Charles II of England and Louis XIV of France sign the Secret Treaty of Dover, which will force England into the Third Anglo-Dutch War.
1676 – Battle of Öland: allied Danish-Dutch forces defeat the Swedish navy in the Baltic Sea, during the Scanian War (1675–79).
1679 – The Scottish Covenanters defeat John Graham of Claverhouse at the Battle of Drumclog.
1773 – Wolraad Woltemade rescues 14 sailors at the Cape of Good Hope from the sinking ship De Jonge Thomas by riding his horse into the sea seven times. Both he and his horse, Vonk, drowned on his eighth attempt.
1779 – The court-martial for malfeasance of Benedict Arnold, a general in the Continental Army during the American Revolutionary War, begins.
1792 – Kentucky is admitted as the 15th state of the United States.
1794 – The battle of the Glorious First of June is fought, the first naval engagement between Britain and France during the French Revolutionary Wars.
1796 – Tennessee is admitted as the 16th state of the United States.
1812 – War of 1812: U.S. President James Madison asks the Congress to declare war on the United Kingdom.
1813 – Capture of USS Chesapeake.
1815 – Napoleon promulgates a revised Constitution after it passes a plebiscite.
1831 – James Clark Ross becomes the first European at the North Magnetic Pole.
1849 – Territorial Governor Alexander Ramsey declared the Territory of Minnesota officially established.
1854 – Åland War: The British navy destroys merchant ships and about 16,000 tar barrels of the wholesale stocks area in Oulu, Grand Duchy of Finland.
1855 – The American adventurer William Walker conquers Nicaragua.
1857 – Charles Baudelaire's Les Fleurs du mal is published.
1857 – The Revolution of the Ganhadores begins in Salvador, Bahia, Brazil.
1861 – American Civil War: The Battle of Fairfax Court House is fought.
1862 – American Civil War: Peninsula Campaign: The Battle of Seven Pines (or the Battle of Fair Oaks) ends inconclusively, with both sides claiming victory.
1868 – The Treaty of Bosque Redondo is signed, allowing the Navajo to return to their lands in Arizona and New Mexico.
1879 – Napoléon Eugène, the last dynastic Bonaparte, is killed in the Anglo-Zulu War.
1890 – The United States Census Bureau begins using Herman Hollerith's tabulating machine to count census returns.

1901–present
1913 – The Greek–Serbian Treaty of Alliance is signed, paving the way for the Second Balkan War.
1916 – Louis Brandeis becomes the first Jew appointed to the United States Supreme Court.
1918 – World War I: Western Front: Battle of Belleau Wood: Allied Forces under John J. Pershing and James Harbord engage Imperial German Forces under Wilhelm, German Crown Prince.
1919 – Prohibition comes into force in Finland.
1922 – The Royal Ulster Constabulary is founded.
1929 – The 1st Conference of the Communist Parties of Latin America is held in Buenos Aires.
1930 – The Deccan Queen is introduced as first intercity train between Bombay VT (Now Mumbai CST) and Poona (Pune) to run on electric locomotives.
1939 – First flight of the German Focke-Wulf Fw 190 fighter aircraft.
1941 – World War II: The Battle of Crete ends as Crete capitulates to Germany.
  1941   – The Farhud, a massive pogrom in Iraq, starts and as a result, many Iraqi Jews are forced to leave their homes.
1943 – BOAC Flight 777 is shot down over the Bay of Biscay by German Junkers Ju 88s, killing British actor Leslie Howard and leading to speculation that it was actually an attempt to kill British Prime Minister Winston Churchill.
1946 – Ion Antonescu, "Conducator" ("Leader") of Romania during World War II, is executed.
1950 – The Declaration of Conscience speech, by U.S. Senator from Maine, Margaret Chase Smith: "The nation sorely needs a Republican victory. But I do not want to see the Republican party ride to political victory on the Four Horsemen of Calumny - Fear, Ignorance, Bigotry, and Smear." A response to Joseph R. McCarthy's speech at Wheeling, West Virginia.
1950 – The Chinchaga fire ignites. By September, it would become the largest single fire on record in North America.
1958 – Charles de Gaulle comes out of retirement to lead France by decree for six months.
1961 – The Canadian Bank of Commerce and Imperial Bank of Canada merge to form the Canadian Imperial Bank of Commerce, the largest bank merger in Canadian history.
1962 – Adolf Eichmann is hanged in Israel.
1964 – Kenya becomes a republic with Jomo Kenyatta  as its first President.
1974 – The Heimlich maneuver for rescuing choking victims is published in the journal Emergency Medicine.
1975 – The Patriotic Union of Kurdistan was founded by Jalal Talabani, Nawshirwan Mustafa, Fuad Masum and others.
1978 – The first international applications under the Patent Cooperation Treaty are filed.
1979 – The first black-led government of Rhodesia (now Zimbabwe) in 90 years takes power.
1980 – Cable News Network (CNN) begins broadcasting.
1988 – European Central Bank is founded in Brussels.
  1988   – The Intermediate-Range Nuclear Forces Treaty comes into effect.
1990 – Cold War: George H. W. Bush and Mikhail Gorbachev sign a treaty to end chemical weapon production.
1993 – Dobrinja mortar attack: Thirteen are killed and 133 wounded when Serb mortar shells are fired at a soccer game in Dobrinja, west of Sarajevo.
1994 – Republic of South Africa becomes a republic in the Commonwealth of Nations.
1999 – American Airlines Flight 1420 slides and crashes while landing at Little Rock National Airport, killing 11 people on a flight from Dallas to Little Rock.
2001 – Nepalese royal massacre: Crown Prince Dipendra of Nepal shoots and kills several members of his family including his father and mother.
  2001   – Dolphinarium discotheque massacre: A Hamas suicide bomber kills 21 at a disco in Tel Aviv.
2004 – Oklahoma City bombing co-conspirator Terry Nichols is sentenced to 161 consecutive life terms without the possibility of parole.
2008 – A fire on the back lot of Universal Studios breaks out, destroying the attraction King Kong Encounter and a large archive of master tapes for music and film, the full extent of which was not revealed until 2019.
2009 – Air France Flight 447 crashes into the Atlantic Ocean off the coast of Brazil on a flight from Rio de Janeiro to Paris. All 228 passengers and crew are killed.
  2009   – General Motors files for Chapter 11 bankruptcy. It is the fourth largest United States bankruptcy in history.
2011 – A rare tornado outbreak occurs in New England; a strong EF3 tornado strikes Springfield, Massachusetts, during the event, killing four people.
  2011   – Space Shuttle Endeavour makes its final landing after 25 flights.
2015 – A ship carrying 458 people capsizes in the Yangtze river in China's Hubei province, killing 400 people.

Births

Pre-1600
1134 – Geoffrey, Count of Nantes (d. 1158)
1300 – Thomas of Brotherton, 1st Earl of Norfolk, English politician, Lord Marshal of England (d. 1338)
1451 – Giles Daubeney, 1st Baron Daubeney (d. 1508)
1460 – Enno I, Count of East Frisia, German noble (d. 1491)
1480 – Tiedemann Giese, Polish bishop (d. 1550)
1498 – Maarten van Heemskerck, Dutch painter (d. 1574)
1522 – Dirck Coornhert, Dutch writer and scholar (d. 1590)
1563 – Robert Cecil, 1st Earl of Salisbury, English politician, Secretary of State for England (d. 1612)

1601–1900
1612 – Frans Post, Dutch painter (d. 1680)
1633 – Geminiano Montanari, Italian astronomer and academic (d. 1687)
1637 – Jacques Marquette, French missionary and explorer (d. 1675)
1653 – Georg Muffat, French organist and composer (d. 1704)
1675 – Francesco Scipione, marchese di Maffei, Italian archaeologist and playwright (d. 1755)
1762 – Edmund Ignatius Rice, Irish priest and missionary, founded the Irish Christian Brothers (d. 1844)
1765 – Christiane Vulpius, mistress and wife of Johann Wolfgang Goethe (d. 1816)
1770 – Friedrich Laun, German author (d. 1849)
1790 – Ferdinand Raimund, Austrian actor and playwright (d. 1836)
1796 – Nicolas Léonard Sadi Carnot, French physicist and engineer (d. 1832)
1800 – Edward Deas Thomson, Australian educator and politician, Chief Secretary of New South Wales (d. 1879)
1801 – Brigham Young, American religious leader, 2nd President of The Church of Jesus Christ of Latter-day Saints (d. 1877)
1804 – Mikhail Glinka, Russian composer (d. 1857)
1808 – Henry Parker, English-Australian politician, 3rd Premier of New South Wales (d. 1881)
1815 – Otto of Greece (d. 1862)
1819 – Francis V, Duke of Modena (d. 1875)
1822 – Clementina Maude, Viscountess Hawarden, English portrait photographer (d. 1865)
1825 – John Hunt Morgan, American general (d. 1864)
1831 – John Bell Hood, American general (d. 1879)
1833 – John Marshall Harlan, American lawyer, associate justice of the U.S. Supreme Court, and politician; Attorney General of Kentucky (d. 1911)
1843 – Henry Faulds, Scottish physician and missionary, developed fingerprinting (d. 1930)
1869 – Richard Wünsch, German philologist (d. 1915)
1873 – Elena Alistar, Bessarabian politician (d. 1955)
1874 – Yury Nikolaevich Voronov, Russian botanist (d. 1931)
1878 – John Masefield, English author and poet (d. 1967)
1879 – Max Emmerich, American triathlete and gymnast (d. 1956)
1887 – Clive Brook, English actor (d. 1974)
1889 – Charles Kay Ogden, English linguist and philosopher (d. 1957)
1890 – Frank Morgan, American actor (d. 1949)
1892 – Amanullah Khan, sovereign of the Kingdom of Afghanistan, (d. 1960)

1901–present
1901 – Hap Day, Canadian ice hockey player, referee, and manager (d. 1990)
  1901   – Tom Gorman, Australian rugby league player  (d. 1978)
  1901   – John Van Druten, English-American playwright and director (d. 1957)
1903 – Vasyl Velychkovsky, Ukrainian-Canadian bishop and martyr (d. 1973)
  1903   – Hans Vogt, Norwegian linguist and academic (d. 1986)
1905 – Robert Newton, English-American actor (d. 1956)
1907 – Jan Patočka, Czech philosopher (d. 1977)
  1907   – Frank Whittle, English airman and engineer, developed the jet engine (d. 1996)
1909 – Yechezkel Kutscher, Slovakian-Israeli philologist and linguist (d. 1971)
1910 – Gyula Kállai, Hungarian communist leader, Chairman of the Council of Ministers of the People's Republic of Hungary (d. 1996)
1912 – Herbert Tichy, Austrian geologist, author, and mountaineer (d. 1987)
1913 – Bill Deedes, English journalist and politician (d. 2007)
1915 – John Randolph, American actor (d. 2004)
1917 – William Standish Knowles, American chemist and academic, Nobel Prize laureate (d. 2012)
1920 – Robert Clarke, American actor and producer (d. 2005)
1921 – Nelson Riddle, American composer and bandleader (d. 1985)
1922 – Joan Caulfield, American model and actress (d. 1991)
  1922   – Povel Ramel, Swedish singer-songwriter and pianist (d. 2007)
1924 – William Sloane Coffin, American minister and activist (d. 2006)
1925 – Dilia Díaz Cisneros, Venezuelan teacher (d. 2017)
1926 – Johnny Berry, English footballer (d. 1994)
  1926   – Andy Griffith, American actor, singer, producer, and screenwriter (d. 2012)
  1926   – Marilyn Monroe, American model and actress (d. 1962)
  1926   – George Robb, English international footballer and teacher (d. 2011)
  1926   – Richard Schweiker, American soldier and politician, 14th United States Secretary of Health and Human Services (d. 2015)
1928 – Georgy Dobrovolsky, Ukrainian pilot and astronaut (d. 1971)
  1928   – Steve Dodd, Australian actor and composer (d. 2014)
  1928   – Bob Monkhouse, English actor and screenwriter (d. 2003)
1929 – Nargis, Indian actress (d. 1981)
  1929   – James H. Billington, American academic and Thirteenth Librarian of Congress (d. 2018)
1930 – Matt Poore, New Zealand cricketer (d. 2020)
  1930   – Edward Woodward, English actor (d. 2009)
1931 – Walter Horak, Austrian footballer (d. 2019)
1932 – Frank Cameron, New Zealand cricketer
  1932   – Christopher Lasch, American historian and critic (d. 1994)
1933 – Haruo Remeliik, Palauan politician, 1st President of Palau (d. 1985)
  1933   – Charles Wilson, American lieutenant and politician (d. 2010)
1934 – Pat Boone, American singer-songwriter and actor
  1934   – Peter Masterson, American actor, director, producer and screenwriter (d. 2018)
  1934   – Doris Buchanan Smith, American author (d. 2002)
1935 – Norman Foster, Baron Foster of Thames Bank, English architect, founded Foster and Partners
  1935   – Reverend Ike, American minister and television host (d. 2009)
  1935   – Jack Kralick, American baseball player (d. 2012)
  1935   – Percy Adlon, German director, screenwriter and producer
  1935   – John C. Reynolds, American computer scientist and academic (d. 2013)
1936 – Anatoly Albul, Soviet and Russian wrestler (d. 2013)
  1936   – André Bourbeau, Canadian politician (d. 2018)
  1936   – Bekim Fehmiu, Bosnian actor (d. 2010)
  1936   – Gerald Scarfe, English illustrator and animator
1937 – Morgan Freeman, American actor and producer
  1937   – Rosaleen Linehan, Irish actress
  1937   – Colleen McCullough, Australian neuroscientist and author (d. 2015)
1939 – Cleavon Little, American actor and comedian (d. 1992)
1940 – René Auberjonois, American actor (d. 2019)
  1940   – Katerina Gogou, Greek writer and actress (d. 1993)
  1940   – Kip Thorne, American physicist, astronomer, and academic
1941 – Dean Chance, American baseball player and manager (d. 2015)
  1941   – Toyo Ito, Japanese architect, designed the Torre Realia BCN and Hotel Porta Fira
  1941   – Alexander V. Zakharov, Russian physicist and astronomer 
1942 – Parveen Kumar, Pakistani-English physician and academic
1943 – Orietta Berti, Italian singer and actress
  1943   – Richard Goode, American pianist
  1943   – Lorrie Wilmot, South African cricketer (d. 2004)
1944 – Colin Blakemore, British neurobiologist
  1944   – Robert Powell, English actor
1945 – Jim McCarty, American blues rock guitarist
  1945   – Linda Scott, American singer
  1945   – Lydia Shum, Chinese-Hong Kong actress (d. 2008)
  1945   – Frederica von Stade, American soprano and actress
1946 – Brian Cox, Scottish actor 
1947 – Ron Dennis, English businessman, founded the McLaren Group
  1947   – Jonathan Pryce, Welsh actor and singer
  1947   – Ronnie Wood, English guitarist, songwriter, and producer 
1948 – Powers Boothe, American actor (d. 2017)
  1948   – Tomáš Halík, Czech Roman Catholic priest, philosopher, theologian and scholar
  1948   – Michel Plasse, Canadian ice hockey player (d. 2006)
  1948   – Juhan Viiding, Estonian poet and actor (d. 1995)
1950 – Perrin Beatty, Canadian businessman and politician
  1950   – Charlene, American singer-songwriter
  1950   – Jean Lambert, English educator and politician
  1950   – Michael McDowell, American author and screenwriter (d. 1999)
1952 – Şenol Güneş, Turkish footballer and manager
  1952   – David Lan, South African-English director and playwright
  1952   – Mihaela Loghin, Romanian shot putter
1953 – Ronnie Dunn, American singer-songwriter and guitarist 
  1953   – Ted Field, American entrepreneur and race car driver
1954 – Jill Black, English lawyer and judge
1955 – Chiyonofuji Mitsugu, Japanese sumo wrestler (d. 2016)
  1955   – Lorraine Moller, New Zealand runner
  1955   – Tony Snow, American journalist, 26th White House Press Secretary (d. 2008)
1956 – Patrick Besson, French writer and journalist
  1956   – Petra Morsbach, German author
1958 – Nambaryn Enkhbayar, Mongolian lawyer and politician, 3rd President of Mongolia
  1958   – Gennadiy Valyukevich, Belarusian triple jumper (d. 2019)
1959 – Martin Brundle, English racing driver and sportscaster
  1959   – Alan Wilder, English singer-songwriter, keyboard player, and producer
1960 – Simon Gallup, English musician
  1960   – Vladimir Krutov, Russian ice hockey player and coach (d. 2012)
  1960   – Sergey Kuznetsov, Russian footballer and manager
  1960   – Giorgos Lillikas, Cypriot politician, 8th Cypriot Minister of Foreign Affairs
  1960   – Lucy McBath, American politician
  1960   – Elena Mukhina, Russian gymnast (d. 2006)
1961 – Paul Coffey, Canadian ice hockey player
  1961   – Mark Curry, American actor
  1961   – Werner Günthör, Swiss shot putter and bobsledder
  1961   – John Huston, American golfer
  1961   – Peter Machajdík, Slovakian-German pianist and composer
1963 – Vital Borkelmans, Belgian footballer
  1963   – Miles J. Padgett, Scottish physicist and academic
  1963   – David Westhead, English actor and producer
1965 – Larisa Lazutina, Russian skier
  1965   – Olga Nazarova, Russian sprinter
1966 – Greg Schiano, American football player and coach
1968 – Jason Donovan, Australian actor and singer
  1968   – Mathias Rust, German aviator
1969 – Luis García Postigo, former Mexican footballer
  1969   – Teri Polo, American actress
1970 – Alexi Lalas,  American soccer player, manager, and sportscaster                             
1971 – Mario Cimarro,  Cuban-American actor and singer
1973 – Frédérik Deburghgraeve, Belgian swimmer
  1973   – Adam Garcia, Australian actor
  1973   – Heidi Klum, German-American model, fashion designer, and producer
1974 – Alanis Morissette, Canadian-American singer-songwriter, guitarist, producer, and actress
  1974   – Michael Rasmussen, Danish cyclist
  1974   – Sarah Teather, English politician
1975 – Michal Grošek, Czech-Swiss ice hockey player and coach
  1975   – Frauke Petry, German politician
1976 – Marlon Devonish, English sprinter and coach
1977 – Arsen Gitinov, Russian and Kyrgyzstani freestyle wrestler
  1977   – Danielle Harris, American actress
  1977   – Brad Wilkerson, American baseball player and coach
  1977   – Sarah Wayne Callies, American actress
1978 – Antonietta Di Martino, Italian high jumper
1979 – Santana Moss, American football player
  1979   – Markus Persson, Swedish game designer, founded Mojang
1981 – Brandi Carlile, American singer-songwriter and guitarist
  1981   – Amy Schumer, American actress
  1981   – Carlos Zambrano, Venezuelan-American baseball player
  1981   – Aleksei Mikhailovich Uvarov, Russian footballer
1982 – Justine Henin, Belgian tennis player
1984 – Jean Beausejour, Chilean footballer
  1984   – Olivier Tielemans, Dutch racing driver
  1984   – Nikki Glaser, American comedian
1985 – Tirunesh Dibaba, Ethiopian runner
  1985   – Dinesh Karthik, Indian cricketer
  1985   – Nick Young, American basketball player
  1985   – Sam Young, American basketball player
1986 – Moses Ndiema Masai, Kenyan runner
  1986   – Chinedu Obasi, Nigerian footballer
  1986   – Ben Smith, New Zealand rugby player
1987 – Zoltán Harsányi, Slovakian footballer
  1987   – Yarisley Silva, Cuban pole vaulter
1988 – Javier Hernández, Mexican footballer
1989 – Nataliya Goncharova, Ukrainian/Russian volleyball player
  1989   – Sammy Alex Mutahi, Kenyan runner
1990 – Miller Bolaños, Ecuadoran footballer
  1990   – Carlota Ciganda, Spanish golfer
1991 – Tyrone Roberts, Australian rugby league player
1994 – Kagayaki Taishi, Japanese sumo wrestler
1996 – Edvinas Gertmonas, Lithuanian footballer
  1996   – Tom Holland, English actor
1999 – Technoblade, American YouTuber and streamer (d. 2022)

Deaths

Pre-1600 
195 BC – Emperor Gaozu of Han (b. 256 BC)
 193 – The emperor Marcus Didius Julianus is murdered in his palace. 
 352 – Ran Min, "Heavenly Prince" (Tian Wang) during the Sixteen Kingdoms
 654 – Pyrrhus, patriarch of Constantinople 
 829 – Li Tongjie, general of the Tang Dynasty
 847 – Xiao, empress of the Tang Dynasty
 896 – Theodosius Romanus, Syriac Orthodox patriarch of Antioch
 932 – Thietmar, duke of Saxony 
1146 – Ermengarde of Anjou, Duchess regent of Brittany (b. 1068)
1186 – Minamoto no Yukiie, Japanese warlord
1220 – Henry de Bohun, 1st Earl of Hereford (b. 1176)
1310 – Marguerite Porete, French mystic
1354 – Kitabatake Chikafusa (b. 1293)
1434 – King Wladislaus II of Poland
1449 – Polissena Sforza, Lady of Rimini (b. 1428)
1571 – John Story, English martyr (b. 1504)

1601–1900
1616 – Tokugawa Ieyasu, Japanese shogun (b. 1543)
1625 – Honoré d'Urfé, French author and poet (b. 1568)
1639 – Melchior Franck, German composer (b. 1579)
1660 – Mary Dyer, English-American martyr (b. 1611)
1662 – Zhu Youlang, Chinese emperor (b. 1623)
1681 – Cornelis Saftleven, Dutch genre painter (b. 1607)
1710 – David Mitchell, Scottish admiral and politician (b. 1642)
1740 – Samuel Werenfels, Swiss theologian (b. 1657)
1769 – Edward Holyoke, American pastor and academic (b. 1689)
1773 – Wolraad Woltemade, South African folk hero (b. 1708)
1795 – Pierre-Joseph Desault, French anatomist and surgeon (b. 1744)
1815 – Louis-Alexandre Berthier, French general and politician, French Minister of War (b. 1753)
1823 – Louis-Nicolas Davout, French general and politician, French Minister of War (b. 1770)
1826 – J. F. Oberlin, French pastor and philanthropist (b. 1740)
1830 – Swaminarayan, Indian religious leader (b. 1781)
1833 – Oliver Wolcott Jr., American lawyer and politician, 2nd United States Secretary of the Treasury, 24th Governor of Connecticut (b. 1760)
1841 – David Wilkie, Scottish painter and academic (b. 1785)
1846 – Pope Gregory XVI (b. 1765)
1861 – John Quincy Marr, American captain (b. 1825)
1864 – Hong Xiuquan, Chinese rebel, led the Taiping Rebellion (b. 1812)
1868 – James Buchanan, American lawyer and politician, 15th President of the United States (b. 1791)
1872 – James Gordon Bennett, Sr., American publisher, founded the New York Herald  (b. 1795)
1873 – Joseph Howe, Canadian journalist and politician, 5th Premier of Nova Scotia (b. 1804)
1876 – Hristo Botev, Bulgarian poet and journalist (b. 1848)
1879 – Napoléon, Prince Imperial of France (b. 1856)

1901–present
1908 – Allen Butler Talcott, American painter (b. 1867)
1925 – Thomas R. Marshall, American politician, 28th Vice President of the United States (b. 1854)
1927 – Lizzie Borden, American accused murderer (b. 1860)
  1927   – J. B. Bury, Irish historian, philologist, and scholar (b. 1861)
1934 – Sir Alfred Rawlinson, 3rd Baronet, English colonel and polo player (b. 1867)
1935 – Arthur Arz von Straußenburg, Romanian-Hungarian general (d. 1857)
1938 – Ödön von Horváth, Croatian-French author and playwright (b. 1901)
1941 – Hans Berger, German neurologist and academic (b. 1873)
  1941   – Hugh Walpole, New Zealand-English author (b. 1884)
1943 – Leslie Howard, English actor, director, and producer (b. 1893)
  1943   – Wilfrid Israel, English-German businessman and philanthropist (b. 1899)
1946 – Ion Antonescu, Romanian marshal and politician, 43rd Prime Minister of Romania (b. 1882)
1948 – Alex Gard, Russian-American cartoonist (b. 1900)
1952 – John Dewey, American psychologist and philosopher (b. 1859)
1953 – Emanuel Vidović, Croatian painter and illustrator (b. 1870)
1954 – Martin Andersen Nexø, Danish-German journalist and author (b. 1869)
1960 – Lester Patrick, Canadian ice hockey player and coach (b. 1883)
  1960   – Paula Hitler, German-Austrian sister of Adolf Hitler (b. 1896)
1962 – Adolf Eichmann, a German Nazi SS-Obersturmbannführer  (b. 1906)
1963 – Walter Lee, Australian politician, 24th Premier of Tasmania (b. 1874)
1965 – Curly Lambeau, American football player and coach, founded the Green Bay Packers (b. 1898)
1966 – Papa Jack Laine, American drummer and bandleader (b. 1873)
1968 – Helen Keller, American author and activist (b. 1880)
  1968   – André Laurendeau, Canadian playwright, journalist, and politician (b. 1912)
1969 – Ivar Ballangrud, Norwegian speed skater (b. 1904)
1971 – Reinhold Niebuhr, American theologian and academic (b. 1892)
1979 – Werner Forssmann, German physician and academic, Nobel Prize laureate (b. 1904)
1980 – Arthur Nielsen, American businessman, founded the ACNielsen company (b. 1897)
1981 – Carl Vinson, American lawyer and politician (b. 1883)
1983 – Prince Charles, Count of Flanders (b. 1903)
  1983   – Anna Seghers, German writer (b. 1900)
1985 – Richard Greene, English actor and soldier (b. 1918)
1986 – Jo Gartner, Austrian racing driver (b. 1958)
1987 – Rashid Karami, Lebanese lawyer and politician, 32nd Prime Minister of Lebanon (b. 1921)
1988 – Herbert Feigl, Austrian philosopher from the Vienna Circle (b. 1902)
1989 – Aurelio Lampredi, Italian engineer, designed the Ferrari Lampredi engine (b. 1917)
1991 – David Ruffin, American singer-songwriter (b. 1941)
1996 – Neelam Sanjiva Reddy, Indian politician, 6th President of India (b. 1913)
1999 – Christopher Cockerell, English engineer, invented the hovercraft (b. 1910)
2000 – Tito Puente, American drummer, composer, and producer (b. 1923)
2001 – Hank Ketcham, American cartoonist, created Dennis the Menace (b. 1920)
  2001   – notable victims of the Nepalese royal massacre
Aishwarya of Nepal (b. 1949)
Birendra of Nepal (b. 1945)
Dhirendra of Nepal (b. 1950)
Prince Nirajan of Nepal (b. 1978)
Princess Shruti of Nepal (b. 1976)
2002 – Hansie Cronje, South African cricketer (b. 1969)
2004 – William Manchester, American historian and author (b. 1922)
2005 – Hilda Crosby Standish, American physician (b. 1902)
  2005   – George Mikan, American basketball player and coach (b. 1924)
2007 – Tony Thompson, American singer and songwriter (b. 1975)
2008 – Tommy Lapid, Israeli journalist and politician, 17th Justice Minister of Israel (b. 1931)
  2008   – Yves Saint Laurent, French fashion designer, founded Saint Laurent Paris (b. 1936)
2009 – Vincent O'Brien, Irish horse trainer (b. 1917)
2010 – Kazuo Ohno, Japanese dancer (b. 1906)
  2010   – Andrei Voznesensky, Russian poet (b. 1933)
2011 – Haleh Sahabi, Iranian humanitarian and activist (b. 1957)
2012 – Faruq Z. Bey, American saxophonist and composer (b. 1942)
  2012   – Pádraig Faulkner, Irish educator and politician, 19th Irish Minister of Defence (b. 1918)
  2012   – Milan Gaľa, Slovak politician (b. 1953)
2013 – James Kelleher, Canadian lawyer and politician, 33rd Solicitor General of Canada (b. 1930)
2014 – Ann B. Davis, American actress (b. 1926)
  2014   – Valentin Mankin, Ukrainian sailor (b. 1938)
2015 – Charles Kennedy, Scottish journalist and politician (b. 1959)
  2015   – Joan Kirner, Australian educator and politician, 42nd Premier of Victoria (b. 1938) 
  2015   – Nicholas Liverpool, Dominican lawyer and politician, 6th President of Dominica (b. 1934)
  2015   – Jacques Parizeau, Canadian economist and politician, 26th Premier of Quebec (b. 1930)
  2015   – Jean Ritchie, American singer-songwriter (b. 1922)
2018 – Sinan Sakić, Serbian pop-folk singer (b. 1956)
2019 – Ani Yudhoyono, Indonesian politician, 6th First Lady of Indonesia. (b. 1952)

Holidays and observances
Children's Day (International), and its related observances:
The Day of Protection of Children Rights (Armenia)
Mothers' and Children's Day (Mongolia)
Christian feast day:
Annibale Maria di Francia
Crescentinus
Fortunatus of Spoleto
Herculanus of Piegaro
Íñigo of Oña
Justin Martyr (Roman Catholic, Eastern Orthodox, Anglican, Lutheran)
Ronan of Locronan
June 1 (Eastern Orthodox liturgics)
Earliest day on which June Holiday can fall, while June 7 is the latest; celebrated on the first Monday in June. (Ireland)
Earliest day on which Labour Day can fall, while June 7 is the latest; celebrated on the first Friday in June. (The Bahamas)
Earliest day on which Teacher's Day can fall, while June 7 is the latest; celebrated on the first Sunday in June. (Hungary)
Earliest day on which the Queen's Birthday can fall, while June 7 is the latest; celebrated on the first Monday in June. (New Zealand, Cook Islands, Fiji)
Earliest day on which Seamen's Day can fall, while June 7 is the latest; celebrated on the first Sunday in June. (Iceland)
Earliest day on which Western Australia Day can fall, while June 7 is the latest; celebrated on the first Sunday in June. (Western Australia)
Global Day of Parents (International)
Independence Day, celebrates the independence of Samoa from New Zealand in 1962.
Madaraka Day (Kenya)
National Maritime Day (Mexico)
National Tree Planting Day (Cambodia)
Pancasila Day (Indonesia)
President's Day (Palau)
The beginning of Crop over, celebrated until the first Monday of August. (Barbados)
Victory Day (Tunisia)
World Milk Day (International)

References

External links

 
 
 

Days of the year
June